Karan Veer Mehra is an Indian television actor. He began his career with the show, Remix in 2005. Currently he is seen in Hott studio's web series Couple of Mistakes, opposite Barkha SenGupta. He was also seen playing the lead role in Sony SAB TV, Biwi aur Main. Karan added Veer to his name on this instruction of his grandmother. Veer is the name of Karan's late grandfather. He was also seen in Bollywood movies such as Ragini MMS 2, Mere Dad Ki Maruti, Blood Money, Badmashiyaan and Amen.

Karan Veer Mehra also pleaded support to initiate Road Safety Awareness with Diageo.

Early life 
Karan Mehra was born in Delhi. He studied in a boarding school in mussoorie : Wynberg Allen School till 10th. Post that he pursued his further studies in Delhi. He completed 11th and 12th in Delhi Public School (DPS). He did graduation in Advertising & Sales Promotion from Delhi College of Arts & Commerce (Delhi University).

Career

Web series 
Karan recently appeared in a Web Series It's Not That Simple (2018) in as "Jayesh" aired on "Voot" along with Swara Bhaskar, Purab Kohli, Sumeet Vyas, Vivan Bhatena, Neha Chauhan, Manasi Rachh, Devika Vatsa, Rohan Shah, Jia Vaidya etc. Karan will also be seen as Ashwin in web series Couple of Mistakes opposite Barkha Bisht Sengupta.
In the year 2021, the character of Abhay, a suspicious spouse, will be played by Karan Veer Mehra in the TV show Ziddi Dil.

Filmography

Web series

Television

Sports enthusiast 
Karan has been a big sports enthusiast. He was a part of Box Cricket League and ASFC (All Stars Football Club).

References

External links

Karan Veer Mehra on Twitter

Indian male television actors
Living people
Male actors in Hindi television
Male actors from Delhi
Year of birth missing (living people)